Albert Jorquera Fortià (born 3 March 1979) is a Spanish retired footballer who played as a goalkeeper.

He spent the bulk of his professional career with Barcelona (ten years, including loans), but could never be more than second or third choice at his main club, which he left in 2009.

Club career

Playing
Born in Bescanó, Girona, Catalonia, Jorquera started playing in FC Barcelona's youth ranks in 1994. After that he went to its C team in 1998, being promoted to FC Barcelona Atlètic the following year.

After loan stints with Segunda División B clubs AD Ceuta and CE Mataró, Jorquera returned as first choice for the reserves. His first appearance in La Liga was against Athletic Bilbao on 17 January 2004 (a 1–1 home draw where he put on a Player of the match performance) and, the following season, following the departure of unsettled Rüştü Reçber, he joined the main squad permanently.

Jorquera signed a new contract in March 2007, until June 2008. However, on 29 December, playing an unofficial game for the Catalonia national team, he suffered an anterior cruciate ligament injury to his right knee, which kept him out of the pitches for six months; eventually, RC Celta de Vigo's José Manuel Pinto was brought in until the end of the campaign.

In March 2008, Jorquera agreed to a new extension, this time running until summer 2010. On 9 December he got his first start in 2008–09, playing in a 2–3 home loss against FC Shakhtar Donetsk in the last UEFA Champions League group-stage match – Víctor Valdés, amongst other regulars, was being rested for El Clásico against Real Madrid, the following Saturday. Additionally, Pinto had previously been cast as the starter in the Copa del Rey.

Jorquera joined Girona FC of the Segunda División on 25 August 2009, with Barcelona having the right to recall him if needed. After starting throughout most of the season, however, the 31-year-old announced his retirement citing personal reasons.

Coaching
Jorquera joined newly promoted second-tier team UE Llagostera as goalkeeping coach in 2014. In October 2017, he left the Barcelona youth ranks to be Gabri's assistant for FC Sion in Switzerland.

In December 2018, Jorquera was second-in-command to the same former teammate at FC Andorra as part of Gerard Piqué's takeover of the principality-based club playing in Catalan regional football. He received his first outright job in August 2020, at FC Santa Coloma in the microstate's own league. Eleven months later, after elimination from the inaugural edition of the UEFA Europa Conference League by Hibernian, he returned to his job at Llagostera, now renamed UE Costa Brava.

Style of play
A tall, consistent and well-rounded goalkeeper, Jorquera was known mainly for his reflexes, anticipation and agility. He also stood out for his work-rate, determination, character and mentality throughout his career.

Personal life

Jorquera was cousin of another Barcelona youth graduate, Marc Crosas. Professionally, he played for Celtic amongst other clubs.

After retiring, he took advantage of his gemology degree from the University of Barcelona and joined the family's jewellery business. In February 2011, he was entered in 12th place on Convergence and Union's (CiU) list for the local elections in Girona, headed by Carles Puigdemont. While his party won, he was not elected as they earned ten seats in the city hall.

Club statistics

Honours
Barcelona
La Liga: 2004–05, 2005–06
Supercopa de España: 2005, 2006
UEFA Champions League: 2005–06, 2008–09

References

External links

1979 births
Living people
People from Gironès
Sportspeople from the Province of Girona
Spanish footballers
Footballers from Catalonia
Association football goalkeepers
La Liga players
Segunda División players
Segunda División B players
Tercera División players
FC Barcelona C players
FC Barcelona Atlètic players
FC Barcelona players
AD Ceuta footballers
CE Mataró players
Girona FC players
UEFA Champions League winning players
Catalonia international footballers
Spanish football managers
Spanish expatriate football managers
Expatriate football managers in Andorra
Spanish expatriate sportspeople in Andorra
Spanish expatriate sportspeople in Switzerland
FC Barcelona non-playing staff